Alfred Imonje is a Kenyan professional football manager.

Career
Since July to December 2011 he coached the Somalia national football team.

References

External links

Profile at Soccerpunter.com

Year of birth missing (living people)
Living people
Kenyan football managers
Expatriate football managers in Somalia
Somalia national football team managers
Place of birth missing (living people)
Kenyan expatriate football managers
Kenyan expatriate sportspeople in Somalia